Seminario Pontificio (Spanish for Pontifical Seminary) is a hamlet located in the Spanish municipality of Comillas, in the province of Cantabria. As of 2008, it had no inhabitants.

See also
 Comillas Pontifical University

Populated places in Cantabria